Honey Creek may refer to some places in the United States:

In Indiana
Honey Creek (White River), a stream in Johnson County, Indiana
Honey Creek, Indiana, an unincorporated community in Henry County
Honey Creek Township, Vigo County, Indiana
Honey Creek Middle School, in Terre Haute, Indiana
Honey Creek Railroad, a Class III short-line railroad in Rush County, Indiana

In Iowa
 Honey Creek (Des Moines River tributary), a river in Iowa
 Honey Creek (Iowa River), a river in Iowa
 Honey Creek (Missouri River), a river in Iowa
Honey Creek (Platte River), a stream in Iowa and Missouri
 Honey Creek Township, Delaware County, Iowa
 Honey Creek Township, Iowa County, Iowa
 Honey Creek, Pottawattamie County, Iowa, an unincorporated community

In Missouri
Honey Creek, Missouri, an unincorporated community
Honey Creek (Beaver Creek), a stream in Douglas County, Missouri
Honey Creek (Big Creek), a stream in Missouri
Honey Creek (Blackwater River), a stream in Missouri
Honey Creek (Daviess County, Missouri), a stream in Missouri
Honey Creek (Fox River), a stream in Missouri
Honey Creek (Limestone Creek), a stream in Dade County, Missouri
Honey Creek (Moreau River), a stream in Missouri
Honey Creek (Platte River), a stream in Iowa and Missouri
Honey Creek (Spring River), a stream in Missouri

In Wisconsin
Honey Creek, Sauk County, Wisconsin, a town
Honey Creek, Walworth County, Wisconsin, an unincorporated community
Honey Creek (Wisconsin River), a stream in Sauk County

Elsewhere
Honey Creek Township, Adams County, Illinois
Honey Creek (Perry County, Ohio), a stream
Honey Creek (Pennsylvania), a tributary of Kishacoquillas Creek
 Honey Creek (Texas), list of Honey Creek place names in Texas

See also